Vojnić is a municipality in Karlovac County, Croatia. There are 4,764 inhabitants, 45% of whom are Serbs and 37% of whom are Croats. The municipality is part of Kordun. Vojnić is underdeveloped municipality which is statistically classified as the First Category Area of Special State Concern by the Government of Croatia.

Languages and names 

On the territory of Vojnić municipality, along with Croatian which is official in the whole country, as a second official language has been introduced Serbian language and Serbian Cyrillic alphabet.

Demographics
In 1991 the municipality of Vojnić had a population of 8,236. 7,366 (89.43%) were Serbs, 436 (5.29%) were Muslims, 116 (1.40%) were Croats and 318 (3.86%) were others.

According to the 2011 census, the municipality consists of 46 settlements:

 Brdo Utinjsko, population 73
 Bukovica Utinjska, population 80
 Donja Brusovača, population 122
 Dunjak, population 39
 Džaperovac, population 12
 Gačeša Selo, population 46
 Gejkovac, population 183
 Gornja Brusovača, population 33
 Jagrovac, population 44
 Johovo, population 36
 Jurga, population 89
 Kartalije, population 43
 Kestenovac, population 10
 Klokoč, population 64
 Klupica, population 11
 Ključar, population 86
 Knežević Kosa, population 119
 Kokirevo, population 43
 Kolarić, population 195
 Krivaja Vojnićka, population 21
 Krstinja, population 82
 Kupljensko, population 317
 Kusaja, population 45
 Lipovac Krstinjski, population 7
 Lisine, population 11
 Loskunja, population 58
 Malešević Selo, population 44
 Mandić Selo, population 65
 Međeđak Utinjski, population 62
 Miholjsko, population 123
 Mracelj, population 116
 Mračaj Krstinjski, population 7
 Petrova Poljana, population 17
 Podsedlo, population 76
 Prisjeka, population 24
 Radmanovac, population 33
 Radonja, population 103
 Rajić Brdo, population 26
 Selakova Poljana, population 0
 Svinica Krstinjska, population 253
 Široka Rijeka, population 161
 Štakorovica, population 23
 Utinja Vrelo, population 18
 Vojišnica, population 404
 Vojnić, population 1 221
 Živković Kosa, population 119

History

Until 1918, Vojnić (named VOINIC in 1850) was part of the Austrian monarchy (Kingdom of Croatia-Slavonia, after the compromise of 1867), in the Croatian Military Frontier.  It was administered by the SZLUINER Grenz-Infanterie-Regiment  N°IV before 1881. Vojnić became a district capital in the Modruš-Rijeka County in the Kingdom.

Culture
 Local branch of SKD Prosvjeta Vojnić with a very active folk dance section

Sights and events
 Monument to the uprising of the people of Kordun and Banija
 Zelena noć Petrove gore - one-day folklore event hosted by the local football club, Petrova Gora, and the local branch of SKD Prosvjeta Vojnić. The event brings together amateur groups nurturing traditional folk dancing and singing from different parts of Croatia, Serbia and Bosnia and Herzegovina.

References

External links

Municipalities of Croatia
Populated places in Karlovac County
Modruš-Rijeka County